Erythroxylum ellipticum is a Northern Australian species of Erythroxylum. It grows as a shrub or tree.

It is locally known as kerosene wood or turpentine tree - because its green branches and twigs burn readily.

It is found on rocky hillsides and in creek beds growing in sandstone based soils in the Kimberley region of Western Australia and extending across the top end of the Northern Territory and on parts of Cape York Peninsula in Queensland.

References

External links
 Erythroxylum ellipticum - A comprehensive review of Erythroxylum ellipticum.

ellipticum
Malpighiales of Australia
Rosids of Western Australia
Flora of the Northern Territory
Flora of Queensland
Plants described in 1863
Taxa named by George Bentham